The Xposé (stylized as The XPOSÉ) is a 2014 romantic thriller film directed by Anant Mahadevan and produced by Vipin Reshammiya under the banner of HR Musik. The film stars Himesh Reshammiya alongside newcomers Sonali Raut and Zoya Afroz, while Irrfan Khan makes a special appearance. Musician Yo Yo Honey Singh also appears in the film, making his Bollywood acting debut.

Plot

Two actresses, Zara Fernandes and Chandni Roy, are both set to make their film debut on the same date. Chandni's film becomes a box office success, whereas Zara's film is a flop. This angers Zara who believes she is higher and better than every other new actress. Zara starts an argument with Chandni after an awards party, and the two end up fighting. Later that night, Zara is murdered. The blame obviously goes towards Chandni, and she has no way to prove her innocence.

Chandni's lover, Ravi Kumar, decides to step in and find the real murderer to save his love. Ravi happens to be an ex-cop, who was sacked from his job as a police officer after shooting a parliamentarian . Ravi is now an actor, who happens to have debuted in the same film as Zara. The suspect list in the murder is extremely large, there is Virmaan, who is Chandni's ex-boyfriend, Subba Prasad who is Zara's film director and KD, a music director who had an affair with Zara, as well as many other suspects.

After Ravi's investigation, it  turns out that after Zara and Chandni fight, Zara went up to the terrace where she met KD (hinting that their affair was still going on at the time of her death) and as the two got together, KD's wife Shabnam started looking for KD. KD heard Shabnam coming up to the terrace, so tried to run away, and accidentally pushed Zara away from him, which led to her to fall from the terrace. It also turns out that after falling down, she landed outside Subba Prasad's window. Subba decided to let her fall so her death could gain attention and maybe help their flop film be successful.

KD & Subba are convicted. KD is jailed for 7 years and Subba Prasad is given life sentence. After all the supposed suspects leave the court, Chandni confesses to her love for Ravi. The two get together, and Ravi tells Chandni that actually, he knew that she was the one who murdered Zara. In a flashback, it is revealed that after Subba let Zara fall down, she was still alive and was found by Chandni. Chandni was so frustrated and annoyed by her that she hit Zara on the head with a glass bottle, finally killing her.

Cast
 Himesh Reshammiya as Ravi Kumar 
 Sonali Raut as Zara Peter Fernandes
 Yo Yo Honey Singh as Kenny Damania (KD)
 Zoya Afroz as Chandni Roy
 Jesse Randhawa as Shabnam Rai
 Anant Mahadevan as Subba Prasad
 Rajesh Sharma as Raj Grover
 Nakul Vaid as Virman Shah
 Kunal Thakkur as Ronnie
 Ashwin Dhar as Bobby Chaddha
 Kanika Dang as D'Silva
 Daya Shankar Pandey as Naidu
 Irrfan Khan as Alec D'Costa and narrator (Special appearance)
 Adil Hussain as Rajan (Special appearance)
 Rushad Rana as a prosecution Lawyer (Special appearance)

Music

Soundtrack
The soundtrack was composed by Himesh Reshammiya, with lyrics penned by Sameer, Kumaar and Shabbir Ahmed. Vocalists include Yo Yo Honey Singh, Reshammiya, Ankit Tiwari, Palak Muchhal. The soundtrack released on 14 April 2014 with The Times Of India stating "An album that has something for everyone, The Xpose is masala magic at its most potent."

Critical reception

Reception

Taran Adarsh of Bollywood Hungama rated the film 3/5 and concluded "an entertaining outing for fans of atypical Bollywood-style murder mysteries."

Mehul S Thakkar of Deccan Chronicle gave it 3.5 stars stating "What also adds to the whole packaging of the film is the attention to minute detail of that era be it as minute as a ceiling lamp or a pen. R.K studios, a treasure house of antique items, have been credited to supply film cameras of those times for the shoot, shown as props in the film."

Subhash K Jha reviewed the film for NDTV and gave it 3.5 stars stating "The suspense drama is bright, bouncy, believable and entertaining."

Vishal Verma for IndiaGlitz has rated 3 Stars stating "The Xpose is a Dazzling Tour De Sixties" Rahul Desai for Mumbai Mirror has given 3 stars for its entertainment. Shrey Saxena have rated this movie 1/10.

Awards and nominations

 BIG Star Entertainment Awards

 Life Ok Now Awards

References

External links

2010s Hindi-language films
2014 films
2014 masala films
Films scored by Himesh Reshammiya
Indian detective films
Indian thriller films
HR Musik films
Films directed by Anant Mahadevan
2014 thriller films
Hindi-language thriller films